The 2018 Tennessee State Tigers football team represented Tennessee State University as a member of the Ohio Valley Conference (OVC) in the 2018 NCAA Division I FCS football season. They were led by ninth-year head coach Rod Reed and played their home games at Nissan Stadium and Hale Stadium. Tennessee State finished the season 4–5 overall and 3–4 in OVC play to place fifth.

Previous season
The Tigers finished the 2017 season 6–5, 2–5 in OVC play to finish in a tie for seventh place.

Preseason

OVC media poll
On July 20, 2018, the media covering the OVC released their preseason poll with the Tigers predicted to finish in fourth place. On July 23, the OVC released their coaches poll with the Tigers predicted to finish in sixth place.

Preseason All-OVC team
The Tigers had three players selected to the preseason all-OVC team.

Offense

Steven Newbold – WR

Defense

Vincent Sellers – DB

Dajour Nesbeth – DB

Schedule

Game summaries

Bethune–Cookman

at Eastern Illinois

at Vanderbilt

at Austin Peay

at Murray State

Tennessee Tech

at Southeast Missouri State

Jacksonville State

UT Martin

References

Tennessee State
Tennessee State Tigers football seasons
Tennessee State Tigers football